Joaquín García Barbero (born 12 January 1986), simply known as Joaquín, is a Spanish footballer who is currently playing for CF Montañesa.

Football career
Born in Barcelona, Catalonia, Joaquín graduated with UDA Gramenet's youth setup, and made his senior debuts with the reserves in 2005. He played his first match with the main squad on 15 March 2009, coming on as a second half substitute in a 0–1 home loss against Ontinyent CF in the Segunda División B.

In the 2011 summer, after Gramenet's relegation, Joaquín moved to fellow league team CF Badalona. He appeared regularly for the club during the course of three seasons, and joined UE Cornellà also in the third level on 7 August 2014.

On 3 January 2015, after appearing rarely, Joaquín moved abroad for the first time in his career, joining Cypriot First Division side Ethnikos Achna. He played his first match as a professional on 2 February, starting in a 0–2 home loss against Apollon Limassol.

On 26 July 2017, Joaquín was announced as a player for Hong Kong Premier League club Dreams.

References

External links
 
 

1986 births
Living people
Footballers from Barcelona
Spanish footballers
Association football midfielders
UDA Gramenet footballers
CF Badalona players
UE Cornellà players
Ethnikos Achna FC players
Europa F.C. players
Dreams Sports Club players
Churchill Brothers FC Goa players
Lorca FC players
CF Montañesa players
Segunda División B players
Tercera División players
Cypriot First Division players
Hong Kong Premier League players
Spanish expatriate footballers
Spanish expatriate sportspeople in Cyprus
Spanish expatriate sportspeople in Gibraltar
Spanish expatriate sportspeople in Thailand
Spanish expatriate sportspeople in Hong Kong
Spanish expatriate sportspeople in India
Expatriate footballers in Cyprus
Expatriate footballers in Gibraltar
Expatriate footballers in Thailand
Expatriate footballers in Hong Kong
Expatriate footballers in India